Bo'ao Lighthouse is situated on the north side of the entrance to the harbor at Bo'ao, Hainan, China. The tower is white in colour, round, with four ribs. It has a minimum diameter of six metres, a maximum of 38.5 metres, and is made of reinforced concrete. With the lantern and gallery atop, it has a total height of 23 metres.

Every nine seconds this lighthouse emits three white flashes. It has a range of 35 km.

It was built at the national level by the government of China. Construction started April 28, 2008 and it was put into service in 2011.

References

External links
 Images of the interior
 Image of the old lighthouse with the new one under construction

Towers completed in 2011
Lighthouses in China
Buildings and structures in Hainan
2011 establishments in China